The 2013 Challenge Chateau Cartier de Gatineau was held October 24 to 27, 2013 at the Buckingham Curling Club in Buckingham, Quebec and the Centre Sportif Robert Rochon in Masson, Quebec as part of the 2013–14 World Curling Tour.  The purses for the men's and women's were CAD$42,500 and CAD$15,000, respectively.

2006 Olympic gold medalist Brad Gushue of Newfoundland defeated Guelph, Ontario's Robert Rumfeldt in the men's final. Toronto's Lisa Farnell won the women's event, defeating her third (Erin Morrissey)'s younger sister Katie Morrissey of Ottawa in the final.

Men

Playoffs

Women

Playoffs

External links
Event site

2013 in curling